The Fourth Itō Cabinet is the 10th Cabinet of Japan led by Itō Hirobumi from October 19, 1900, to May 10, 1901.

Cabinet 

Following Itō's resignation as Prime Minister on May 10, 1901, Saionji Kinmochi was acting Prime Minister from May 10, 1901, to June 2, 1901.

References 

Cabinet of Japan
1900 establishments in Japan
Cabinets established in 1900
Cabinets disestablished in 1901